Jay Harrison (born November 3, 1982) is a Canadian former professional ice hockey defenceman who played for the Toronto Maple Leafs, Carolina Hurricanes and the Winnipeg Jets of the National Hockey League.

Playing career

Amateur
Harrison played in the 1996 Quebec International Pee-Wee Hockey Tournament with the Whitby Wildcats minor ice hockey team. He later played as a 16-year-old for the Oshawa Legionnaires of the Ontario Junior Hockey League (OJHL).  He was the 1st overall selection of the Brampton Battalion in the 1998 OHL Priority Selection.  He spent four seasons in the OHL with the Battalion.

Professional
Harrison was drafted by the Toronto Maple Leafs in the third round, 82nd overall, of the 2001 NHL Entry Draft. After spending four seasons in the American Hockey League (AHL) with Toronto's farm team, Harrison made his NHL debut on January 27, 2006, against the Montreal Canadiens, in which he registered his first NHL career point, coming in the form of an assist.  On June 16, 2008, Harrison signed a one-year contract with EV Zug of the Swiss National League A, but on March 27, 2009, he returned to the Toronto Maple Leafs, signing a deal, pro-rated at $475,000, to play out the rest of the 2008–09 season.

On July 9, 2009, he signed a two-way contract with the Carolina Hurricanes that would pay him $500,000 in the NHL and $125,000 in the AHL. On October 9, 2009, he scored his first NHL goal in a 7–2 victory for the Hurricanes over the Florida Panthers.

During the 2014–15 season, Harrison was traded by the Hurricanes to the Winnipeg Jets in exchange for a 2015 NHL Entry Draft sixth round pick on December 18, 2014.

In the following 2015–16 season, on the eve of opening night on October 6, 2015, Harrison cleared waivers, and was reassigned to the Manitoba Moose of the American Hockey League. In returning to the AHL for the first time since 2010, Harrison appeared in 18 games with the Moose before he was included in a trade deadline deal by the Jets, along with Andrew Ladd and Matt Fraser to the Chicago Blackhawks in exchange for Marko Daňo and a first-round pick in the 2016 NHL Entry Draft on February 25, 2016. He was immediately assigned to the Blackhawks AHL affiliate, the Rockford IceHogs.

Career statistics

Regular season and playoffs

International

Awards and honours

Personal life
Harrison and his wife Jodean have four daughters. The family moved to Bowmanville, Ontario following his retirement from hockey.

Harrison earned degrees in psychology and counselling and works for Game Change, a counselling service designed for athletes. He also serves as a consultant to the NHL on player assistance issues.

References

External links

1982 births
Living people
Albany River Rats players
Brampton Battalion players
Canadian ice hockey defencemen
Carolina Hurricanes players
Ice hockey people from Ontario
Manitoba Moose players
Memphis RiverKings players
Sportspeople from Oshawa
Sportspeople from Whitby, Ontario
St. John's Maple Leafs players
Toronto Maple Leafs draft picks
Toronto Maple Leafs players
Toronto Marlies players
Winnipeg Jets players
EV Zug players
Canadian expatriate ice hockey players in Switzerland